Scrobipalpa parki is a moth in the family Gelechiidae. It was described by Povolný in 1993. It is found in Korea and China (Gansu, Hebei, Ningxia, Qinghai, Shaanxi, Xinjiang).

In South Korea, the larvae have been recorded feeding on Lycium chinese. In China, it was reared from Lycium barbarum.

References

Scrobipalpa
Moths described in 1993